Sagarika Mukherjee, also known as Saag, is an Indian singer and actress. She sings mainly in Hindi, Assamese and Bengali language songs but has also sung in Tamil and Telugu languages. She is the daughter of singer and composer Manas Mukherjee and granddaughter of lyricist Jahar Mukherjee.

Before going solo, she was half of a popular Indian duo with her brother with whom she released albums such as Q-Funk, Roop Inka Mastana and Naujawan. Apart from singing and acting in movies and albums, she is also a restaurateur.

Early life
Sagarika Mukherjee was born in Mumbai, Maharashtra, India, but originally belongs from Kolkata metrocity of West Bengal in a Bengali family. In 1973, she moved to Mumbai, Maharashtra (now in Mumbai) with her family. Her father died in 1986.  Then, her mother became a singer and took charge of the entire family.

Career

Early singing
Sagarika made her debut as a child playback singer in the Bollywood film Shaayad in 1979 and in the Bengali film Agnishuddi in 1984. Later, she sang several Bollywood film songs.

In 1998, She released her first album Maa after going solo. Then in 2001, her second album Mere Liye was released along with her brother 
Shaan and co-singers Zubeen Garg and Suchitra Pillai and also was her first music composer of all songs in the album. Later in 2006, Her third album It's All About Love was released by Universal Distribution. She collaborated with Pakistani band Strings on the song "Pal". It is featured in the band's fourth album Dhaani.

In 1998, Sagarika debuted in the Assamese Music Industry as an adult playback singer with her first Assamese Song in the film Joubone Amoni Kore. However, the film did not feature her song and it was only used as a bonus track in the original soundtrack for the film.  A year later, the Assamese film Morom Nodir Gabhoru Gaat featured two songs sung by Sagarika, thus leading to her official debut in an Assamese film. Sagarika contributed to several Assamese albums and original soundtracks like Pansoi, Megha, Meghor Boron, Maharathi, Jon Jwole Kopalot, Bishforan, Garam Botaah, Aei Morom Tumar Babe, Nayak, Jonaki Mon etc.

Acting career
Along with singing, Sagarika acted her first Bengali-language film "Shyam Saheb" in 1986. Later, she acted few Bollywood and regional films as well as guest appearances in regional films such as Biyer Phool (1996), Prem Aru Prem (2002), Jonaki Mon (2002), two Assamese film and Inteqam: The Perfect Game (2004). She did not appear in any film in 2005 or 2006. Her only film in 2007 was Kalishankar (2007), a Bengali film (opposite Prosenjit Chatterjee and Swastika Mukherjee). In the same year, she initially made a supporting role in the Bollywood film Life in a Metro, however, her scene was cut during the editing process.

Personal life
Sagarika Martin Da Costa married UK-Italian businessman, entrepreneur and event manager Martin Da Costa on 4 February 2002  and she currently lives in Rome, Italy since 2015. They have two sons, Joshua Da Costa and Michel Da Costa.

Discography

Studio albums

Remix albums

Compilation albums

Other albums

Film songs

Non-film songs

Filmography

Music videos

As a composer

As a songwriter

Awards and nominations
Sagarika with her brother and co-artists won the Best Remix Song for "Q-Funk" in MTV Awards in 1996  and this song was also received two nominations from Best Music Video by Screen Awards and Best Indian Pop Song by Channel V Asia Music Awards in the same year. In the next year, She also won the best Indian pop artist for "Aisa Hota Hai" by Screen Awards in 1997. In the same year, Sagarika also received two nominations as Best Female Pop Artist for the song "Disco Deewane" and for the song "Dhoop Mein Chaya Jaise" by Channel V Asia Music Awards in 1999. Twenty years later, She was awarded as "You Shine Ingenuity" by Aparajita Awards in 2019 but does not included any song.
Following are the list of awards and nominations in different categories.

References

External links

Straight Answers Times of India - 2 December 2003

Year of birth missing (living people)
20th-century Indian women singers
20th-century Indian singers
21st-century Indian women singers
21st-century Indian singers
Living people
Actresses from Assam
Actresses from Kolkata
Actresses from West Bengal
Actresses in Hindi cinema
Actresses in Bengali cinema
Assamese playback singers
Assamese-language singers
Bengali actresses
Bengali Hindus
Bengali playback singers
Bengali-language singers
Bengali singers
Bollywood playback singers
Indian film actresses
Indian folk-pop singers
Indian women singer-songwriters
Indian women pop singers
Indian women playback singers
People from Guwahati
People from Kolkata
Performers of Hindu music
Singers from Assam
Singers from Guwahati
Singers from Kolkata
Singers from West Bengal
Women musicians from West Bengal
Jai Hind College alumni